Category 5 is the fifth album of the rock band FireHouse. It was originally released in 1998 in Japan and in 1999 in the United States by Lightyear Records.

The album featured a more direct contribution from bassist Perry Richardson and ironically, it was his last studio album with the band. It features a different, more experimental sound when compared to the band's previous hard rock albums, while still featuring some signature ballads.

Track listing
All songs written by Snare and Leverty, except where noted.
 "Can't Stop the Pain" (Foster, Leverty, Richardson) - 5:37
 "Acid Rain" (Effler, Richardson, Rogers) - 3:27
 "Bringing Me Down" - 4:39
 "Dream" (Richardson, Rogers) - 4:13
 "Get Ready" (Foster, Leverty, Richardson, Snare) - 4:18
 "If It Changes" - 4:56
 "The Day, the Week, and the Weather" (Effler, Richardson, Rogers) - 5:27
 "The Nights Were Young" - 4:18
 "Have Mercy" (Foster, Leverty, Richardson, Snare) - 4:36
 "I'd Do Anything" - 5:45
 "Arrow Through My Heart" (Effler, Richardson, Rogers) - 4:11
 "Life Goes On" - 10:24 (includes the hidden "Get To Know You", song by bassist Perry Richardson)

Personnel
C.J. Snare - vocals, keyboards
Bill Leverty - guitars
Michael Foster - drums
Perry Richardson - bass guitar

References

1998 albums
FireHouse (band) albums
Lightyear Entertainment albums
Pony Canyon albums